The 2021–22 Atlanta Hawks season was the 73rd season of the franchise in the National Basketball Association (NBA) and 54th in Atlanta. The Hawks entered the season with much higher expectations due to their surprising Eastern Conference Finals appearance in the previous season, but struggled on defense and hovered around .500 for most of the season. Despite the struggles, the Hawks qualified for the Play-in Tournament after a win over the Cleveland Cavaliers on April 12. They defeated both the Charlotte Hornets and the Cleveland Cavaliers to clinch a playoff berth as the No. 8 seed, but fell to the top-seeded Miami Heat in five games.

Draft picks

Roster

Standings

Division

Conference

Game log

Preseason

|-style="background:#fcc;"
| 1
| October 4
| @ Miami
| 
| Collins, Gallinari, Young (14)
| John Collins (9)
| Delon Wright (5)
| FTX Arena19,600
| 0–1
|-style="background:#fcc;"
| 2
| October 6
| Cleveland
| 
| Cam Reddish (20)
| Gorgui Dieng (11)
| Gorgui Dieng (6)
| State Farm Arena11,158
| 0–2
|-style="background:#cfc;"
| 3
| October 9
| Memphis
| 
| Bogdanović, Collins (16)
| John Collins (12)
| Bogdan Bogdanović (5)
| FedExForum11,027
| 1–2
|-style="background:#cfc;"
| 4
| October 14
| Miami
| 
| Trae Young (27)
| John Collins (11)
| Trae Young (15)
| State Farm Arena12,527
| 2–2

Regular season

|-style="background:#cfc;"
| 1
| October 21
| Dallas
| 
| Cam Reddish (20)
| Clint Capela (13)
| Trae Young (14)
| State Farm Arena17,162
| 1–0
|-style="background:#fcc;"
| 2
| October 23
| @ Cleveland
|  
| Trae Young (24)
| Clint Capela (14)
| Trae Young (7) 
| Rocket Mortgage FieldHouse16,846 
| 1–1
|-style="background:#cfc;"
| 3
| October 25
| Detroit
| 
| Trae Young (32)
| Gorgui Dieng (12)
| Trae Young (9)
| State Farm Arena14,209
| 2–1
|-style="background:#cfc;"
| 4
| October 27
| @ New Orleans
| 
| Trae Young (31)
| Capela, Collins (12)
| Trae Young (7)
| Smoothie King Center15,541
| 3–1
|-style="background:#fcc;"
| 5
| October 28
| @ Washington
| 
| John Collins (28)
| John Collins (12)
| Trae Young (13)
| Capital One Arena13,653
| 3–2
|-style="background:#fcc;"
| 6
| October 30
| @ Philadelphia
| 
| Cam Reddish (16)
| Clint Capela (12)
| Trae Young (10)
| Wells Fargo Center20,031
| 3–3

|-style="background:#cfc;"
| 7
| November 1
| Washington
| 
| Trae Young (26)
| Clint Capela (12)
| Bogdanović, Collins, Young (6)
| State Farm Arena14,632
| 4–3
|-style="background:#fcc;"
| 8
| November 3
| @ Brooklyn
| 
| De'Andre Hunter (26)
| Clint Capela (16)
| Trae Young (10)
| Barclays Center17,323
| 4–4
|-style="background:#fcc;"
| 9
| November 4
| Utah
| 
| Trae Young (21)
| Clint Capela (10)
| Trae Young (7)
| State Farm Arena16,590
| 4–5
|-style="background:#fcc;"
| 10
| November 6
| @ Phoenix
| 
| Trae Young (31)
| Clint Capela (13)
| Trae Young (13)
| Footprint Center15,412
| 4–6
|-style="background:#fcc;"
| 11
| November 8
| @ Golden State
| 
| Trae Young (28)
| Capela, Collins (6)
| Trae Young (9)
| Chase Center18,064
| 4–7
|-style="background:#fcc;"
| 12
| November 9
| @ Utah
| 
| Kevin Huerter (28)
| Clint Capela (12)
| Trae Young (6)
| Vivint Arena18,306
| 4–8
|-style="background:#fcc;"
| 13
| November 12
| @ Denver
| 
| Trae Young (30)
| Clint Capela (13)
| Trae Young (9)
| Ball Arena16,849
| 4–9
|-style="background:#cfc;"
| 14
| November 14
| Milwaukee
| 
| Trae Young (42)
| Clint Capela (13)
| Trae Young (10)
| State Farm Arena16,901
| 5–9
|-style="background:#cfc;"
| 15
| November 15
| Orlando
| 
| Collins, Young (23)
| Clint Capela (16)
| Trae Young (6)
| State Farm Arena13,061
| 6–9
|-style="background:#cfc;"
| 16
| November 17
| Boston
| 
| John Collins (20)
| Clint Capela (12)
| Trae Young (11)
| State Farm Arena16,445
| 7–9
|-style="background:#cfc;"
| 17
| November 20
| Charlotte
| 
| Clint Capela (20)
| Clint Capela (15)
| Trae Young (9)
| State Farm Arena17,320
| 8–9
|-style="background:#cfc;"
| 18
| November 22
| Oklahoma City
| 
| Trae Young (30)
| Clint Capela (14)
| Trae Young (6)
| State Farm Arena15,806
| 9–9
|-style="background:#cfc;"
| 19
| November 24
| @ San Antonio
| 
| Trae Young (31)
| Clint Capela (13)
| Trae Young (11)
| AT&T Center13,161
| 10–9
|-style="background:#cfc;"
| 20
| November 26
| @ Memphis
| 
| Trae Young (31)
| Clint Capela (17)
| Trae Young (10)
| FedEx Forum16,622
| 11–9
|-style="background:#fcc;"
| 21
| November 27
| New York
| 
| Trae Young (33)
| Clint Capela (21)
| Trae Young (7)
| State Farm Arena17,287
| 11–10

|-style="background:#cfc;"
| 22
| December 1
| @ Indiana
| 
| Trae Young (33)
| Clint Capela (9)
| Trae Young (10)
| Gainbridge Fieldhouse12,656
| 12–10
|-style="background:#fcc;"
| 23
| December 3
| Philadelphia
| 
| Trae Young (25)
| Clint Capela (11)
| Trae Young (10)
| State Farm Arena17,092
| 12–11
|-style="background:#fcc;"
| 24
| December 5
| Charlotte
| 
| John Collins (31)
| Clint Capela (14)
| Trae Young (15)
| State Farm Arena16,383
| 12–12
|-style="background:#cfc;"
| 25
| December 6
| @ Minnesota
| 
| Trae Young (29)
| Clint Capela (16)
| Trae Young (11)
| Target Center15,736
| 13–12
|-style="background:#fcc;"
| 26
| December 10
| Brooklyn
| 
| Trae Young (31)
| Clint Capela (16)
| Tare Young (10)
| State Farm Arena17,074
| 13–13
|-style="background:#fcc;"
| 27
| December 13
| Houston
| 
| Trae Young (41)
| Clint Capela (16)
| Trae Young (9)
| State Farm Arena15,456
| 13–14
|-style="background:#cfc;"
| 28
| December 15
| @ Orlando
| 
| Trae Young (28)
| Clint Capela (11)
| Huerter, Wright (5) 
| Amway Center13,576
| 14–14
|-style="background:#fcc;"
| 29
| December 17
| Denver
| 
| Trae Young (34)
| Clint Capela (11)
| Trae Young (10)
| State Farm Arena16,114
| 14–15
|-style="background:#ccc;"
| –
| December 19
| Cleveland
| colspan="6" | Postponed (COVID-19) (Makeup date: March 31)
|-style="background:#fcc;"
| 30
| December 22
| Orlando
| 
| Cam Reddish (34)
| John Collins (12)
| Lance Stephenson (5)
| State Farm Arena15,299
| 14–16
|-style="background:#cfc;"
| 31
| December 23
| @ Philadelphia
| 
| Cam Reddish (18)
| Skylar Mays (11)
| Delon Wright (6)
| Wells Fargo Center20,408
| 15–16
|-style="background:#fcc;"
| 32
| December 25
| @ New York
| 
| Collins, Wright (20)
| Clint Capela (9)
| Gorgui Dieng (5)
| Madison Square Garden19,812
| 15–17
|-style="background:#fcc;"
| 33
| December 27
| Chicago
| 
| Cam Reddish (33)
| Clint Capela (16)
| Trae Young (9)
| State Farm Arena17,049
| 15–18
|-style="background:#fcc;"
| 34
| December 29
| @ Chicago
| 
| Trae Young (26)
| Clint Capela (15)
| Trae Young (11)
| United Center21,372
| 15–19
|-style="background:#cfc;"
| 35
| December 31
| @ Cleveland
| 
| Trae Young (35)
| Clint Capela (23)
| Trae Young (11)
| Rocket Mortgage FieldHouse17,745
| 16–19

|-style="background:#fcc;"
| 36
| January 3
| @ Portland
| 
| Trae Young (56)
| Capela, Gallinari (11)
| Trae Young (14)
| Moda Center15,091
| 16–20
|-style="background:#cfc;"
| 37
| January 5
| @ Sacramento
| 
| Kevin Huerter (25)
| Clint Capela (14)
| Kevin Huerter (5)
| Golden 1 Center13,104
| 17–20
|-style="background:#fcc;"
| 38
| January 7
| @ L.A. Lakers
| 
| Trae Young (25)
| Clint Capela (11)
| Trae Young (14)
| Crypto.com Arena18,997
| 17–21
|-style="background:#fcc;"
| 39
| January 9
| @ L.A. Clippers
| 
| Bogdanović, Young (19)
| Onyeka Okongwu (10)
| Trae Young (7)
| Crypto.com Arena14,836
| 17–22
|-style="background:#fcc;"
| 40
| January 12
| Miami
| 
| John Collins (16)
| John Collins (11)
| Trae Young (5)
| State Farm Arena15,355
| 17–23
|-style="background:#fcc;"
| 41
| January 14
| @ Miami 
| 
| Trae Young (24)
| Onyeka Okongwu (6)
| Trae Young (9)
| FTX Arena19,600
| 17–24
|-style="background:#fcc;"
| 42
| January 15
| New York
| 
| Trae Young (29)
| Kevin Huerter (6)
| Kevin Huerter (6) 
| State Farm Arena16,414
| 17–25
|-style="background:#cfc;"
| 43
| January 17
| Milwaukee
| 
| Trae Young (30)
| John Collins (12)
| Trae Young (11)
| State Farm Arena16,903
| 18–25
|-style="background:#cfc;"
| 44
| January 19
| Minnesota
| 
| Trae Young (37)
| John Collins (12)
| Trae Young (14)
| State Farm Arena15,199
| 19–25
|-style="background:#cfc;"
| 45
| January 21
| Miami
| 
| Trae Young (28)
| De'Andre Hunter (10)
| Trae Young (7)
| State Farm Arena16,385
| 20–25
|-style="background:#cfc;"
| 46
| January 23
| @ Charlotte
| 
| Trae Young (30)
| Clint Capela (8)
| John Collins (5)
| Spectrum Center15,822
| 21–25
|-style="background:#cfc;"
| 47
| January 26
| Sacramento
| 
| Bogdanović, Okongwu (18)
| Danilo Gallinari (9)
| Trae Young (10)
| State Farm Arena15,080
| 22–25
|-style="background:#cfc;"
| 48
| January 28
| Boston
|  
| Collins, Young (21)
| Collins, Young (9)
| Trae Young (6)
| State Farm Arena16,932
| 23–25
|-style="background:#cfc;"
| 49
| January 30
| L.A. Lakers
|  
| Trae Young (36)
| John Collins (11)
| Trae Young (12)
| State Farm Arena17,391
| 24–25
|-style="background:#fcc;"
| 50
| January 31
| Toronto
|  
| Kevin Huerter (26)
| Clint Capela (8)
| Delon Wright (7)
| State Farm Arena14,168
| 24–26
|-

|-
|-style="background:#cfc;"
| 51
| February 3
| Phoenix
| 
| Trae Young (43)
| Clint Capela (12)
| Bogdan Bogdanović (6)
| State Farm Arena16,958
| 25–26
|-style="background:#fcc;"
| 52
| February 4
| @ Toronto
| 
| Collins, Hunter (23)
| Clint Capela (9)
| Trae Young (13)
| Scotiabank Arena0
| 25–27
|-style="background:#fcc;"
| 53
| February 6
| @ Dallas
| 
| John Collins (22)
| John Collins (18)
| Trae Young (11)
| American Airlines Center19,887
| 25–28
|-style="background:#cfc;"
| 54
| February 8
| Indiana
| 
| Trae Young (34)
| Clint Capela (12)
| Trae Young (11)
| State Farm Arena14,265
| 26–28
|-style="background:#fcc;"
| 55
| February 11
| San Antonio
| 
| Bogdan Bogdanović (23)
| Clint Capela (11)
| Trae Young (11)
| State Farm Arena17,234
| 26–29
|-style="background:#fcc;"
| 56
| February 13
| @ Boston
| 
| Trae Young (30)
| Clint Capela (17)
| Trae Young (10)
| TD Garden19,156
| 26–30
|-style="background:#cfc;"
| 57
| February 15
| Cleveland
| 
| Trae Young (41)
| Bogdanović, Capela, Wright (7)
| Trae Young (9)
| State Farm Arena15,947
| 27–30
|-style="background:#cfc;"
| 58
| February 16
| @ Orlando
| 
| Bogdan Bogdanović (23)
| Clint Capela (9)
| Bogdanović, Young (6)
| Amway Center14,398
| 28–30
|-style="background:#fcc;"
| 59
| February 24
| @ Chicago
| 
| Bogdan Bogdanović (27)
| Clint Capela (17)
| Trae Young (10)
| United Center21,236
| 28–31
|-style="background:#cfc;"
| 60
| February 26
| Toronto 
| 
| Trae Young (41)
| Clint Capela (9)
| Trae Young (11)
| State Farm Arena17,870
| 29–31
|-

|-style="background:#fcc;"
| 61
| March 1
| @ Boston
| 
| Trae Young (31)
| Clint Capela (11)
| Trae Young (6)
| TD Garden19,156
| 29–32
|-style="background:#cfc;"
| 62
| March 3
| Chicago
| 
| Trae Young (39)
| Clint Capela (11)
| Trae Young (13)
| State Farm Arena17,522
| 30–32
|-style="background:#cfc;"
| 63
| March 4
| @ Washington
| 
| De'Andre Hunter (26)
| Clint Capela (12)
| Trae Young (8) 
| Capital One Arena15,927
| 31–32
|-style="background:#fcc;"
| 64
| March 7
| @ Detroit
| 
| Bogdan Bogdanović (22)
| Clint Capela (12)
| Trae Young (12)
| Little Caesars Arena14,942
| 31–33
|-style="background:#fcc;"
| 65
| March 9
| @ Milwaukee
| 
| Trae Young (27)
| Clint Capela (9)
| Trae Young (11)
| Fiserv Forum17,341
| 31–34
|-style="background:#cfc;"
| 66
| March 11
| L.A. Clippers
| 
| Trae Young (27)
| Clint Capela (11)
| Trae Young (11)
| State Farm Arena16,862
| 32–34
|-style="background:#cfc;"
| 67
| March 13
| Indiana
| 
| Trae Young (47)
| Onyeka Okongwu (9)
| Bogdan Bogdanović (6)
| State Farm Arena17,038
| 33–34
|-style="background:#cfc;"
| 68
| March 14
| Portland
| 
| Trae Young (46) 
| Clint Capela (16)
| Trae Young (12)
| State Farm Arena16,432
| 34–34
|-style="background:#fcc;"
| 69
| March 16
| @ Charlotte
| 
| De'Andre Hunter (21)
| Clint Capela (15)
| Trae Young (15)
| Spectrum Center16,648
| 34–35
|-style="background:#cfc;"
| 70
| March 18
| Memphis
| 
| Bogdan Bogdanović (30)
| Onyeka Okongwu (9)
| Kevin Huerter (7)
| State Farm Arena18,062
| 35–35
|-style="background:#fcc;"
| 71
| March 20
| New Orleans
| 
| Danilo Gallinari (27)
| Clint Capela (10)
| Trae Young (10)
| State Farm Arena17,123
| 35–36
|-style="background:#cfc;"
| 72
| March 22
| @ New York
| 
| Trae Young (45)
| Danilo Gallinari (10)
| Trae Young (8)
| Madison Square Garden19,812
| 36–36
|-style="background:#fcc;"
| 73
| March 23
| @ Detroit
|  
| Trae Young (21)
| Clint Capela (9)
| Trae Young (9)
| Little Caesars Arena16,212
| 36–37
|-style="background:#cfc;"
| 74
| March 25
| Golden State
|  
| Trae Young (33)
| Clint Capela (13)
| Trae Young (15)
| State Farm Arena17,724
| 37–37
|-style="background:#cfc;"
| 75
| March 28
| @ Indiana
|  
| Bogdan Bogdanović (29)
| Clint Capela (15)
| Trae Young (16)
| Gainbridge Fieldhouse14,212
| 38–37
|-style="background:#cfc;"
| 76
| March 30
| @ Oklahoma City
| 
| Trae Young (41)
| Onyeka Okongwu (13)
| Trae Young (8)
| Paycom Center15,595
| 39–37
|-style="background:#cfc;"
| 77
| March 31
| Cleveland
|  
| Trae Young (30)
| Clint Capela (14)
| Trae Young (9)
| State Farm Arena17,491
| 40–37
|-

|-style="background:#cfc;"
| 78
| April 2
| Brooklyn
| 
| Trae Young (36)
| Clint Capela (12)
| Trae Young (10)
| State Farm Arena18,126
| 41–37
|-style="background:#fcc;"
| 79
| April 5
| @ Toronto
| 
| Trae Young (26)
| Clint Capela (14)
| Trae Young (15)
| Scotiabank Arena19,800
| 41–38
|-style="background:#cfc;"
| 80
| April 6
| Washington
| 
| Trae Young (30)
| Danilo Gallinari (10)
| Trae Young (11)
| State Farm Arena17,381
| 42–38
|-style="background:#fcc;"
| 81
| April 8
| @ Miami
| 
| Trae Young (35)
| Clint Capela (14)
| Trae Young (8)
| FTX Arena19,993
| 42–39
|-style="background:#cfc;"
| 82
| April 10
| @ Houston
| 
| Trae Young (28)
| Clint Capela (13)
| Trae Young (11)
| Toyota Center18,055
| 43–39
|-

Play-in

|- style="background:#cfc;"
| 1
| April 13
| Charlotte
| 
| Trae Young (24)
| Clint Capela (17)
| Trae Young (10)
| State Farm Arena18,137
| 1–0
|- style="background:#cfc;"
| 2
| April 15
| @ Cleveland
| 
| Trae Young (38)
| Onyeka Okongwu (9)
| Trae Young (9)
| Rocket Mortgage FieldHouse19,432
| 2–0

Playoffs

|-style="background:#fcc;"
| 1
| April 17
| @ Miami
| 
| Danilo Gallinari (17)
| Onyeka Okongwu (7)
| Delon Wright (6)
| FTX Arena19,514
| 0–1
|-style="background:#fcc;"
| 2
| April 19
| @ Miami
| 
| Bogdan Bogdanović (29)
| John Collins (10)
| Trae Young (7)
| FTX Arena19,950
| 0–2
|-style="background:#cfc;"
| 3
| April 22
| Miami
| 
| Trae Young (24)
| Bogdan Bogdanović (8)
| Trae Young (8)
| State Farm Arena18,421
| 1–2
|-style="background:#fcc;"
| 4
| April 24
| Miami
| 
| De'Andre Hunter (24)
| Capela, Gallinari, Wright (7)
| Trae Young (5)
| State Farm Arena18,951
| 1–3
|-style="background:#fcc;"
| 5
| April 26
| @ Miami
| 
| De'Andre Hunter (35)
| De'Andre Hunter (11)
| Trae Young (6)
| FTX Arena19,553
| 1–4

Transactions

Trades

Free agents

Re-signed

Additions

Subtractions

References

 

 

Atlanta Hawks seasons
Atlanta Hawks
Atlanta Hawks
Atlanta Hawks